Stephen Potter Corliss (July 26, 1842 – May 9, 1904) was an American soldier who earned a Medal of Honor on January 17, 1895 for service during the American Civil War.

Life and career
Corliss was born in Connecticut. He enlisted in the Union Army on August 12, 1862 at Albany, New York, as a private into 11th New York Light Artillery Regiment. He was discharged for promotion to 2nd lieutenant on June 26, 1864 and was commissioned into Company F, 4th New York Heavy Artillery Regiment.

He was listed as a prisoner of war on August 25, 1864 at the Second Battle of Ream's Station in Virginia. He was returned on December 29, 1864 and promoted the next day to First Lieutenant, Company F, 4th New York Heavy Artillery. On February 5, 1865 he was promoted to Adjutant.

His Medal of Honor citation notes that at South Side Railroad, Virginia, on April 2, 1865, Corliss "raised the fallen colors and, rushing forward in advance of the troops, placed them on the enemy's works."

He was mustered out of service on December 9, 1865.  He was later brevetted to the rank of colonel.

On April 7, 1880 he was elected as a First Class Companion of the New York Commandery of the Military Order of the Loyal Legion of the United States - a military society composed of officers who served in the Union armed forces and their descendants.  He was assigned insignia number 2039.

Corliss died in Pittsfield, Massachusetts and was buried at Albany Rural Cemetery in Albany, New York.

References

External links
1st Lt. Stephen P. Corliss, Company D 4th Heavy Artillery Civil War via New York State Military Museum
Image of Corliss

1842 births
1904 deaths
People of New York (state) in the American Civil War
Union Army colonels
United States Army Medal of Honor recipients
Burials at Albany Rural Cemetery
American Civil War recipients of the Medal of Honor